Yoann Paillot (born 28 May 1991 in Angoulême) is a French cyclist, who currently rides for UCI Continental team .

Major results

2009
 3rd Time trial, National Junior Road Championships
2010
 4th Chrono des Nations U23
2011
 1st  Time trial, UEC European Under-23 Road Championships
 1st Chrono des Nations U23
 2nd Time trial, National Under-23 Road Championships
 6th Chrono Champenois
2012
 1st Chrono des Nations U23
 2nd Overall Kreiz Breizh Elites
1st Young rider classification
 3rd Time trial, National Road Championships
 3rd Grand Prix de la ville de Buxerolles
 6th Time trial, UEC European Under-23 Road Championships
 6th Overall Thüringen Rundfahrt der U23
2013
 1st  Time trial, Mediterranean Games
 1st  Time trial, National Under-23 Road Championships
 2nd  Time trial, UCI Under-23 Road World Championships
 4th Tour du Jura
2015
 1st Stage 3 (TTT) Circuit des Ardennes
2016
 1st Stage 4 Kreiz Breizh Elites
 6th Paris–Mantes-en-Yvelines
2017
 2nd Time trial, National Road Championships
 5th Overall Tour de Gironde
2018
 2nd Grand Prix de la Ville de Lillers
 3rd Overall Etoile de Bessèges
 3rd Overall Tour Poitou-Charentes en Nouvelle-Aquitaine
 4th Chrono des Nations
2019
 4th Time trial, National Road Championships
 5th Overall Tour Poitou-Charentes en Nouvelle-Aquitaine
 6th Overall Étoile de Bessèges
 6th Polynormande
2020
 4th Time trial, National Road Championships
 9th Overall Tour Poitou-Charentes en Nouvelle-Aquitaine

References

External links

1991 births
Living people
French male cyclists
Mediterranean Games gold medalists for France
Mediterranean Games medalists in cycling
Competitors at the 2013 Mediterranean Games
People from Angoulême
Cyclists from Nouvelle-Aquitaine